The Battles of La Güera and Tichla took place between 10–22 December 1975, when the Mauritanian Army invaded the southern part of Western Sahara, which was the zone agreed to be annexed by Mauritania in the Madrid Accords. Mauritanian troops were confronted by Polisario Front guerrillas, forcing the Royal Moroccan Army to intervene on behalf of Mauritania. By the end of 1975, Mauritania controlled the southern half of the former Spanish colony of Río de Oro.

Background
By 6 November 1975, the Spanish government had evacuated the Spanish civilian population from La Güera during a 48-hour operation, part of the broader "Operation Swallow". Nineteen corpses from the La Güera cemetery were exhumed and embarked on the Ciudad de Huesca boat. A few hours later, POLISARIO flags waved on the main buildings of La Güera, after dozens of Sahrawi guerrilla fighters captured it and set up their own administration, and the town became cut off from air, sea and land.

Battles 
On December 20, 1975, the Mauritanian advance began, which at that time had a small army of just 2,000 troops, for which material support was requested from Morocco as well as from France. The occupation of La Güera was carried out by troops that came from Nouadhibou, as well as Nouakchott. The Saharawi troops began to fire and the Mauritanian troops fell back in disorder. Due to the severity of the situation, Colonel Mohamed Ould Ba Ould Abdelkader was appointed as the person in charge of taking over the town. The Saharawi troops, made up of a hundred soldiers, under the command of Buzeid Uld Hmayen, were in a critical and desperate situation since they were isolated by land, sea and air with no possibility of retreat.

The Sahrawi troops attempted to delay the Mauritanian advance as much as possible by holding out in the buildings of the Territorial Police Headquarters from where they repelled the continuous Mauritanian attempts to take the place since they were repelled by a rain of light weapons projectiles. The fighting lasted about ten days and the Saharawis fought hard until the few survivors finally surrendered, since it is estimated that some 80 of the hundred Saharawi soldiers died, including their commander, Ould Hmayen. The surviving soldiers received undignified treatment by the Mauritanian authorities. The victory was short-lived as the Saharawis defeated them in 1978.

Tichla fell to Mauritanian troops on 20 December, while the town of El Argoub, near Villa Cisneros, was captured on January 11, 1976, after having been besieged for two weeks.

Aftermath
The few surviving Sahrawi soldiers from El Argoub were first relocated to the border between the Sahara and Mauritania, being then supplied and evacuated with the assistance of the Algerian Army to Algeria. Tensions between Moroccan and Mauritanian troops arose in the aftermath of the battle, eventually leading to armed confrontations between both parties, beginning with the First Battle of Amgala in 1976.

References

1975 in Spanish Sahara
La Guera and Tichla (1975)
History of Western Sahara
Conflicts in 1975
Western Sahara conflict
1975 in Morocco
La Güera and Tichla (1975)
1975 in Mauritania
December 1975 events in Africa